Clearing the Path to Ascend is the seventh studio album by American doom metal band YOB. It was released in September 2014 under Neurot Recordings. Rolling Stone named it the best metal album and the 50th best album overall of the year.

Track list

Personnel
YOB
 Mike Scheidt – vocal, guitars
 Aaron Rieseberg – bass
 Travis Foster – drums

Additional musicians
 Billy Barnett – hammond organ

Production
 Billy Barnett – engineer
 Brad Boatright – mastering

Design
 Orion Landau – artwork

References

2014 albums